The 5th Battalion, King's Regiment (Liverpool) (5th King's) was a volunteer unit of the King's Regiment (Liverpool) of the British Army, part of the Territorial Force (TF) (the Territorial Army (TA) from 1921).

The battalion traced its heritage to the raising in 1859 of rifle volunteer corps which were soon consolidated into the 1st Lancashire Rifle Volunteer Corps (RVC). Under the Childers Reforms, the 1st Lancashire RVC was affiliated with the King's Regiment (Liverpool), and became the 1st Volunteer Battalion of the regiment. The battalion was transferred to the new Territorial Force when the latter was established in 1908 as the 5th Battalion, King's Regiment (Liverpool).

During the First World War, those who volunteered for overseas service in 1914 were sent to France as the 1/5th King's. The second-line battalion, the 2/5th King's, were also sent to France and were broken up in 1918. A third-line reserve battalion, the 3/5th King's, was formed in 1915 and later became the 5th (Reserve) Battalion. Both remaining battalions were disbanded in 1919 and the 5th Battalion was reconstituted in 1920. It briefly became the 5th (Rifle) Battalion during the interwar period but dropped the title and was mobilised for the Second World War in 1939. After demobilisation in 1945 it was amalgamated with the 9th King's and reconstituted as the 5th Battalion in 1947. When the TA was reduced in 1967, the 5th King's became a company of the Lancastrian Volunteers.

Origins 
The 1st Lancashire RVC of three companies was raised in Liverpool, Lancashire, by Nathaniel Bousfield, one of the originators of the Volunteer movement; his commission as Captain-Commandant dated 11 June 1859 was the first to be issued in the new Volunteer Force. A Liverpool cotton broker, he had made several attempts since 1852 to raise a volunteer unit in the city, and in 1855 had founded the Liverpool Drill Club from young men in the cotton trade who drilled twice weekly in his warehouse. Other corps quickly followed and in May 1860 a number of these units in the Liverpool area were grouped together as the 1st Administrative Battalion, Lancashire RVCs:
 1st (Liverpool) Lancashire RVC, three companies, formed 28 June 1859
 22nd (Liverpool Exchange) Lancashire RVC, two companies, formed 30 January 1860; left 1st Admin Battalion December 1861 and disbanded 1863
 38th (Liverpool) Lancashire RVC, formed in the Fairfield area on 20 January 1860 and known as the 1st Sub-division until March
 45th Lancashire RVC, formed in Liverpool on 27 February 1860
 66th (Liverpool Borough Guard) Lancashire RVC, formed on 25 April 1860
 69th (Liverpool) Lancashire RVC, formed on 31 May 1860

These units (except the 22nd) were consolidated on 27 December 1861 to form the eight-company 1st Lancashire RVC. The 14th (Edge Hill) Lancashire RVC of two companies was formed in the Edge Hill area on 10 November 1859 and known as the 2nd Sub-Division until December. It initially joined the 2nd Admin Battalion, but transferred to the new 1st RVC in December 1861. The 74th (St Anne's) Lancashire RVC formed in the St Anne's area on 2 July 1860 was also absorbed into the 1st Lancashire RVC in 1862. A cadet corps of the RVC was formed in April 1865, but disbanded in 1884.

The 1st Lancashire RVC became a volunteer battalion of The King's (Liverpool Regiment) under the Childers Reforms on 1 July 1881 with ten companies, and was redesignated as the 1st Volunteer Battalion of the regiment on 1 March 1888. Two more companies were sanctioned in 1883, followed by a thirteenth in 1900. When the Territorial Force was established, the battalion became part of it and was reorganised as the 5th Battalion, King's Regiment (Liverpool), on 1 April 1908, assigned to the Liverpool Brigade of the West Lancashire Division. It was headquartered at 65 St. Anne Street in Liverpool, which served as the drill hall for the eight-company battalion.

First World War

1/5th King's 
The 5th Battalion was mobilised on 4 August 1914 with the outbreak of the First World War, under the command of Lieutenant Colonel J. M. McMaster. It was renumbered as the 1/5th Battalion in March 1915 to distinguish it from the second-line battalion. The battalion entered Ath on 11 November, when the Armistice took effect. It was demobilised on 13 June 1919.

2/5th King's 
The 2/5th Battalion was formed in 1914. It was broken up between the 2/6th (Rifle), 2/7th, 11th (Service) (Pioneers), and 12th (Service) Battalions of the King's on 1 February 1918.

3/5th King's 
The 3/5th Battalion was formed in May 1918 at Liverpool. It was redesignated the 5th (Reserve) Battalion on 8 April 1916. It absorbed the 6th (Reserve) (Rifle) Battalion on 1 September of that year. The battalion was disbanded on 12 June 1919 in the United Kingdom.

Interwar period and Second World War 
The 5th King's were reconstituted on 7 February 1920 as part of the TA. They were planned to have been amalgamated with the 6th King's by 1922 but the order was rescinded. The battalion was briefly redesignated the 5th (Rifle) Battalion but the subtitle was removed on 10 August 1937. For the Second World War, the 5th King's were mobilized on 1 September 1939. The battalion served with the 165th Infantry Brigade of the 55th (West Lancashire) Division from 3 September 1939 to 16 April 1943, remaining in the United Kingdom. Between 18 July and 1 November 1943, it was part of the 163rd Infantry Brigade of the 54th (East Anglian) Infantry Division in the United Kingdom. For the Sword Beach landings, the battalion was assigned to No. 5 Beach Group as its infantry. The 5th King's continued to serve as army and corps troops within the 21st Army Group for the rest of the war. After the end of the war, upon demobilization, the battalion was placed in a state of suspended animation.

Postwar 
The 5th and 9th King's were amalgamated on 1 January 1947 to reconstitute the 5th King's. Its successor in the Territorial and Army Volunteer Reserve from 1967 was B (King's) Company, Lancastrian Volunteers.

Honorary Colonels 
The Earl of Derby served as honorary colonel of the battalion during its existence.

References

Citations

Bibliography 
 Ian F.W. Beckett, Riflemen Form: A Study of the Rifle Volunteer Movement 1859–1908, Aldershot: Ogilby Trusts, 1982, .
 

 Edward M. Spiers, The Army and Society 1815–1914, London: Longmans, 1980, .
 
 – published in three volumes

Further reading 

 

King's Regiment (Liverpool)
Infantry battalions of the British Army
Military units and formations in Lancashire
Military units and formations in Liverpool
Military units and formations established in 1908
Military units and formations disestablished in 1967